Polnaya is a river in the Rostov Oblast of Russia and the Luhansk Oblast of Ukraine, the left and largest tributary of Derkul. Its largest tributary is the Komyshna.

References

Rivers of Luhansk Oblast
Rivers of Rostov Oblast